Denise "Mitzi" Epstein is an American politician and a Democratic member of the Arizona Senate elected to represent District 12 in 2022. She was previously elected to the Arizona House of Representatives to represent District 18 in 2016. She is also a computer Systems Analyst and served on the Kyrene Elementary School District Governing Board from 2005 until 2008. She was selected to serve as Minority Leader of the Arizona Senate in March 2023.

Education
Epstein received a bachelor's degree in computer science from Bradley University.

Elections
 2016 – Epstein and Republican incumbent Jill Norgaard defeated Republican incumbent Bob Robson in the general election.
 2014 – Epstein lost the District 18 house election to Republican incumbent Bob Robson and Republican Jill Norgaard.

References

External links
 Biography at Ballotpedia
 Biography at Vote Smart

21st-century American politicians
21st-century American women politicians
Bradley University alumni
Democratic Party members of the Arizona House of Representatives
Living people
Women state legislators in Arizona
Year of birth missing (living people)